The 2022 Sun Belt Conference men's soccer season is the 20th season of men's varsity soccer in the Sun Belt Conference (SBC), but the first since 2020.  The season will culminate with the 2022 Sun Belt Conference Men's Soccer Tournament.

Background
A major conference realignment initially triggered in July 2021 when Oklahoma and Texas announced their plans to leave the Big 12 Conference for the Southeastern Conference eventually led to the reinstatement of Sun Belt men's soccer. Further moves in this realignment cycle saw three men's soccer schools announce that they would join the SBC no later than 2023: Colonial Athletic Association (CAA) member James Madison, and then-reigning national champion Marshall and Old Dominion from Conference USA (C-USA). Accordingly, league commissioner Keith Gill announced on November 1, 2021 that SBC men's soccer would be reinstated no later than 2023.

Shortly after James Madison announced its departure for the SBC, the CAA invoked a provision of its bylaws to bar JMU from its conference championship events. This led the SBC to announce on February 2, 2022 that JMU would join the conference in July 2022 instead of 2023. The following month saw a legal dispute between C-USA and the three schools set to leave that league for the SBC (Marshall, Old Dominion, and Southern Miss, with Southern Miss sponsoring soccer only for women) over their departure date. On March 29, C-USA and those schools reached a settlement that allowed them to join the SBC in July 2022. A little more than a week later on April 6, the SBC announced that men's soccer would be reinstated in 2022. The three incoming members were joined by existing full members Coastal Carolina, Georgia Southern, and Georgia State plus new associate members Kentucky, South Carolina, and West Virginia.

Teams

Stadiums and locations

Head coaches 
Note: All stats current through the completion of the 2021 season

Preseason

Recruiting classes

Preseason Coaches polls
The 2022 SBC Preseason Poll was released on August 15, 2022.  The league's head coaches ranked West Virginia as the preseason favorite, with 5 out of 9 first place votes.  Full results of the poll are shown below:

Preseason awards

All−American Teams

Preseason All SBC

Preseason exhibitions

Regular season 
The regular season will begin on August 25, 2022.

Rankings

National rankings

Regional rankings - USC Southeast Region 

The United Soccer Coaches' Southeast region ranks teams across the Atlantic 10 Conferences.

References

External links
 Sun Belt Conference Men's Soccer

 
2022 NCAA Division I men's soccer season